The 1916 North West Staffordshire by-election was held on 17 January 1916.  The by-election was held due to the death of the incumbent Labour MP, Albert Stanley.  It was won by the Labour candidate Samuel Finney who was unopposed due to a War-time electoral pact.

References

1916 in England
1916 elections in the United Kingdom
By-elections to the Parliament of the United Kingdom in Staffordshire constituencies
Unopposed by-elections to the Parliament of the United Kingdom (need citation)
20th century in Staffordshire
January 1916 events